The 1993–94 Slovak First Football League was the first season of first-tier football league in Slovakia following the dissolution of Czechoslovakia on 1 January 1993. This season started on 14 August 1993 and ended on 15 June 1994.

Overview
It was contested by 12 teams, and ŠK Slovan Bratislava won the championship. The clubs played a home-and-away regular league total of 22 games, after which the top 6 clubs formed a championship group and the bottom 6 a relegation group, playing 10 more games per every club.

It was a historic season for Slovak football because this was the first season since the Breakup of former Czechoslovakia took place, and three Slovak teams from the Czechoslovak First League, Slovan Bratislava, DAC Dunajská Streda (both in the UEFA Cup) and 1.FC Košice (Cup Winners Cup) qualified for European club competitions as Slovaki teams, while only Košice (a second-tier team that had to take part in the qualifying round) managed to get past their first hurdle (Košice would ultimately be eliminated in the first round proper by Besiktas from Turkey).

The 1993–94 Slovak Superliga was formed based on six teams that in previous season played in the 1992–93 Czechoslovak First League (Slovan Bratislava, DAC 1904 Dunajsk Streda, Inter Bratislava, Tatran Prešov, FC Nitra, Spartak Trnava) and six best teams of the 1992–93 Slovak National Football League (the Czechoslovak second-tier competition) (1. FC Košice, Dukla Banská Bystrica, ŠK Žilina, Baník Prievidza, Chemlon Humenné, Lokomotíva Košice) 

At the end of the season two teams would be entitled to enter the newly added qualifying round of the UEFA Cup, and one team would take part in the qualifying round of the Cup Winners Cup. These European places would go on to Tatran Presov (Cup Winners Cup), and two clubs from the capital Bratislava, Slovan (denied a place in the revamped Champions League due to insufficient coefficient) and Inter (who actually would have entered the Champions League qualifying round had they become champion).

Teams

Stadiums and locations

Regular season

League table

Results

Championship group

League table

Results

Relegation group

League table

Results

Season statistics

Top scorers

See also
1993–94 Slovak Cup
1993–94 2. Liga (Slovakia)

References

Slovakia - List of final tables (RSSSF)

Slovak Super Liga seasons
Slovak
1